The Journal of the Chemical Society was a scientific journal established by the Chemical Society in 1849 as the Quarterly Journal of the Chemical Society. The first editor was Edmund Ronalds. The journal underwent several renamings, splits, and mergers throughout its history. In 1980, the Chemical Society merged with several other organizations into the Royal Society of Chemistry. The journal's continuity is found in Chemical Communications, Dalton Transactions, Faraday Transactions, and Perkin Transactions, all of which are published by the Royal Society of Chemistry.

History
Proceedings of the Chemical Society
 Memoirs of the Chemical Society of London (1841)
 Proceedings of the Chemical Society of London (1842–1843)
 Memoirs and Proceedings of the Chemical Society (1843–1848)
 Proceedings of the Chemical Society, London (1885–1914)
 Published as a supplement to Journal of the Chemical Society from 1914 to 1956
 Proceedings of the Chemical Society (1957–1964)

Journal of the Chemical Society

From 1849 to 1965
 Quarterly Journal of the Chemical Society (1849–1862)
 Journal of the Chemical Society (1862–1877)
 Journal of the Chemical Society, Abstracts (1878–1925)
 Journal of the Chemical Society, Transactions (1878–1925)
 Journal of the Chemical Society (1926–1965)

From 1966 to 1971
 Journal of the Chemical Society A: Inorganic, Physical, Theoretical (1966–1971)
 Journal of the Chemical Society B: Physical Organic (1966–1971)
 Journal of the Chemical Society C: Organic (1966–1971)
 Journal of the Chemical Society D: Chemical Communications (1969–1971)

From 1972 until 1996
 Journal of the Chemical Society, Dalton Transactions (1972–1996) (formerly J. Chem. Soc. A)
 Journal of the Chemical Society, Faraday Transactions (1972–1989) (formerly J. Chem. Soc. B)
 Journal of the Chemical Society, Perkin Transactions (1972–1996) (formerly J. Chem. Soc. C)
 Journal of the Chemical Society, Chemical Communications (1972–1995) (formerly J. Chem. Soc. D)

Jubilee of the Chemical Society
 Jubilee of the Chemical Society (1891)

Journal of the Royal Institute of Chemistry
 Proceedings of the Institute of Chemistry of Great Britain and Ireland (1877–1919)
 Journal and Proceedings of the Institute of Chemistry of Great Britain and Ireland (1920–1943)
 Journal and Proceedings of the Royal Institute of Chemistry of Great Britain and Ireland (1944–1948)
 Journal and Proceedings of the Royal Institute of Chemistry (1949)
 Journal of the Royal Institute of Chemistry (1950–1964)

See also
 Chemical Society Reviews
 List of chemistry journals

References

External links
 
 More information about Royal Society of Chemistry journals at Harvard's Library.

Chemistry journals
Royal Society of Chemistry academic journals
Publications established in 1849
1849 establishments in England
Defunct journals of the United Kingdom
Publications disestablished in 1996